Mont Vernon is a town in Hillsborough County, New Hampshire, United States. The population was 2,584 at the 2020 census, up from 2,409 at the 2010 census.

It is not clear why it is spelled differently from the many other towns in the United States named after Mount Vernon, the home of George Washington. Some say the "u" in "Mount" was accidentally dropped by a town clerk filling out official papers; some say the change was made deliberately to draw attention to the town; some say it uses the French spelling of "mont" as a nod to what was then the region's large French-Canadian population. According to town history, there was some dispute about how to spell the name as late as the 1920s, with the post office and one of its most prominent hotels using a "u" for many decades.

History

Mont Vernon broke away from neighboring Amherst in 1803, following a dispute over the town parish. It later added a small portion of neighboring Lyndeborough.

Mont Vernon's general history follows that of many towns in this region. Originally settled for agriculture, its farms were hard hit after the Civil War when railroads opened up better farming land in the Midwest. The town's population peaked in 1870 and began to decline.

By the late 1890s it had become a tourist town, drawing summer visitors from points south, notably Boston, who escaped the heat in Mont Vernon's hills. At one point it had five large summer hotels, including the Grand Hotel, located on top of Grand Hill.

The hotel business began to wither with the development of the automobile, which allowed tourists to reach places like the White Mountains of New Hampshire, and it was killed by the Great Depression. The town's population bottomed out at barely 300 in 1930, at which time the Grand Hotel was destroyed in a fire. The remaining hotels were torn down before World War II.

Since the war, Mont Vernon has slowly become a suburban community. This was significantly accelerated in 1962–1963 when engineers and technicians employed at Sanders Associates in Nashua found homes in Mont Vernon attractive. It wasn't until the 1970 census that the town's official population passed mid-19th century highs.

Agriculture, including a 1940s and 1950s boom in chicken and egg farming, has all but disappeared. As of 2019, the town has one dairy farm. The town has one general store that except for a two-year period from 2010–2012 has operated for more than 120 years in the same location.

Mont Vernon made national news in March 2012 due to debate during the annual town meeting over whether to rename a small fishing hole called Jew Pond. The town eventually renamed it Carleton Pond, after the family which donated the surrounding property to the town.

Geography
Mont Vernon is drained by Beaver Brook, Hartshorn Brook, and Purgatory Brook, south-flowing tributaries of the Souhegan River. The northwest corner of town is drained by Lords Brook, a north-flowing tributary of the South Branch Piscataquog River. The entire town is part of the Merrimack River watershed.

Mont Vernon is served by one state highway, New Hampshire Route 13, which passes through the center of town and leads south to Milford and north to New Boston.

Adjacent municipalities 
 New Boston, New Hampshire (north)
 Amherst, New Hampshire (east)
 Milford, New Hampshire (south)
 Lyndeborough, New Hampshire (west)

Demographics

As of the census of 2000, there were 2,034 people, 693 households, and 575 families residing in the town.  The population density was 122.4 people per square mile (47.3/km2).  There were 720 housing units at an average density of 43.3 per square mile (16.7/km2).  The racial makeup of the town was 98.57% White, 0.15% African American, 0.15% Native American, 0.25% Asian, 0.10% from other races, and 0.79% from two or more races. Hispanic or Latino of any race were 0.54% of the population.

There were 693 households, out of which 43.3% had children under the age of 18 living with them, 73.7% were married couples living together, 5.6% had a female householder with no husband present, and 16.9% were non-families. 12.1% of all households were made up of individuals, and 6.1% had someone living alone who was 65 years of age or older.  The average household size was 2.90 and the average family size was 3.17.

In the town, the population was spread out, with 29.7% under the age of 18, 4.4% from 18 to 24, 30.8% from 25 to 44, 26.0% from 45 to 64, and 9.1% who were 65 years of age or older.  The median age was 38 years. For every 100 females, there were 104.8 males.  For every 100 females age 18 and over, there were 103.1 males.

The median income for a household in the town was $71,250, and the median income for a family was $77,869. Males had a median income of $50,353 versus $32,500 for females. The per capita income for the town was $30,772.  About 1.0% of families and 2.0% of the population were below the poverty line, including 2.3% of those under age 18 and 5.7% of those age 65 or over.

Education
The only public school in town is the Mont Vernon Village School. It is an elementary school, with grades kindergarten to six.  For 7th and 8th grades, Mont Vernon sends its students to Amherst Middle School. For 9th through 12th grades, the students are sent to Souhegan High School, which is in Amherst but jointly owned by Amherst and Mont Vernon. Mont Vernon and Amherst comprise the school administrative unit SAU 39.

Mont Vernon had a private school that started as the Appleton Academy in 1853 and was renamed the McCollom Institute in 1871, which closed shortly before the turn of the century. The building was used as a public high school for a few years, and later became the private Stearns School, which operated from 1906 to 1937, when it shut due to low enrollment in the Great Depression. The building was later used for a public elementary school and now houses the police department and town offices.

Fire department
The former two-story Mont Vernon Fire Station, built in 1947, was located on North Main Street next to the Town Hall. This station had 6 apparatus bays. In March 2007 the town voted to raze the deteriorating building and replace it with a new fire station on the same lot. The new station has 5 apparatus bays facing North Main Street, and 1 bay facing Pinkham Avenue. The Fire Chief has his office in the station, along with a radio and report room, a meeting room, and an office for the Emergency Management Director. The station also contains maintenance, storage, and work rooms.  Emergency medical services are provided by Amherst.

Culture 

The town has two major annual celebrations: On the last Saturday in September, it hosts "Lamson Farm Day" at a town-owned farm to celebrate its agricultural past.  In late April or early May, it has a celebration of spring called the "Mont Vernon Spring Gala".  Both feature games, food and local entertainers.

Sports 

The town has two sports teams that compete regionally. They are the Mont Vernon Falcons basketball team and the Mont Vernon Acers volleyball team. Both teams are for girls age 9–12. The Mont Vernon Village School (grades K–6) has a basketball court and volleyball court. Adult volleyball has been playing on Monday nights at the school since the early 1990s. The town owns land near the school that has a baseball field with bases, fencing and two dugouts. The adjacent field is also used for many other sports. Golf was played behind what is now the site of the post office is in the early 1900s.

There is a gun sporting range in town (the Purgatory Falls Fish & Game Club), and local hunting can be widely found in the fall. There was a ski hill with a rope tow that disbanded in the middle of the 20th century. Mont Vernon is known for views over the Souhegan Valley and has hiking trails, especially in town-owned Lamson Farm and along Purgatory Brook, which forms most of its western border. It is sponsored by Summit for a Cure.

Notable people
Doc Adams (1814–1899), baseball pioneer, New York Knickerbockers player and executive
George Wilkins Kendall (1809–1867),  journalist, Mexican–American War correspondent, and founder of The New Orleans Picayune
Ryan M. Pitts (born 1985), Congressional Medal of Honor recipient
Alex Preston (born 1993), musician,  American Idol (season 13) top 3 finalist

References

External links
 
 Daland Memorial Library
 New Hampshire Economic and Labor Market Information Bureau Profile

 
Towns in Hillsborough County, New Hampshire
Populated places established in 1803
Towns in New Hampshire